AICE may refer to:

 Advanced International Certificate of Education
 Association of Independent Creative Editors
 American Institute of Consulting Engineers, predecessor of the American Council of Engineering Companies
 Associate of the Institution of Civil Engineers

See also
 American Institute of Chemical Engineers (AIChE)
 Aice5, a Japanese musical group